The Paddington Green Children's Hospital was a hospital in Paddington Green, London, that existed from 1883 to 1987. The former building is now grade II listed with Historic England.

History
The hospital was founded at Bell Street by Eustace Smith and T.C. Kirby as the North West London Free Dispensary for Sick Children in 1862. It moved to Paddington Green in 1883 and was completely rebuilt and then reopened by the Duchess of Teck in 1895. A new out-patients department opened in 1911.

In November 1885, the hospital became the first London hospital to appoint a woman to a medical job in an open competition with men when Frances Helen Prideaux became house surgeon. Prideaux contracted diphtheria soon after her appointment and helped her colleagues in their attempts to treat her but died one month after she had started her role.

In 1923, Donald Winnicott obtained a paediatric post at the hospital and was to remain there for the next 40 years. He became a celebrated psychoanalyst and child analyst, member of the Object relations school, writer and broadcaster on the BBC.

Margaret Leigh (pen name Jane Gordon) worked as a nurse in the hospital in the 1930s and 1940s and her memoir Married to Charles (1950) contains much information about the operation of the hospital in that time, especially during The Blitz.

The hospital joined the National Health Service under the same management as St Mary's Hospital in 1948. After services were transferred to St Mary's Hospital, it closed in 1987.

Notable staff
Notable staff have included:
 John Davis
 Leonard Guthrie
 Francis Dudley Hart
 Frederick Charles Hurrell
 Walter Jessop
 Audrey Lees
 Frances Helen Prideaux
 Edith MacGregor Rome
 George Alexander Sutherland
 Peter Tizard
Donald Winnicott

References

External links 

1883 establishments in England
1987 disestablishments in England
Defunct hospitals in London
Grade II listed buildings in the City of Westminster
Grade II listed hospital buildings
Hospitals established in 1862
Children's hospitals in the United Kingdom
Arts and Crafts architecture in England
Voluntary hospitals